Huda Hussein (born August 20, 1965), also known as, is a Kuwaiti-born actress and producer., she is the third name on demand in Gulf TV after Hayat Al-Fahad and Souad Abdullah.

Early life
Huda Hussein Ali Al-Radi was born in Kuwait on August 20, 1965. Her father was employed at the Iraqi ministry of Education and died when Huda was ten years old. Her sister Suad Hussein is also an actress., The overall stability was in Kuwait and Qatar (due to the circumstances of the Iraqi invasion), unlike her country, Iraq, in which she never lived.

Career
When she was four years old, Hussein appeared in Nawader Juha and was involved in radio production Mama Anisa. Her first stage role came with Arab Theater Group's production Nora, directed by Fouad Al-Shatti. Its success led to other roles and she was cast in Sindabad by Mahfouz Abdul Rahman, Arabic adaptations of Alice in Wonderland and Cindrella. She also produced the musical play Laila and the Nile, written by Abdullatif Al-Bannai.

Some of famous TV series, she has starred in, include Al Malika (2011) and Khadimat Al Qawm (2012).

Personal life
Hussein married TV host Abdul Aziz Al-Qattan but the couple separated soon after Al-Qattan's return to Kuwait. 

Her studies were interrupted due to Iraq's Invasion of Kuwait. Later, she received her degree in English literature from the Arab Open University, Kuwait in 2010.

References

1965 births
Living people
Kuwaiti stage actresses
Kuwaiti film actresses
Kuwaiti television actresses
Iraqi film actresses
Iraqi television actresses
20th-century Kuwaiti actresses
21st-century Kuwaiti actresses
Kuwaiti people of Iraqi descent